Santpoort Noord railway station is located in Santpoort-Noord, the Netherlands. The station opened 27 September 1957 on the Haarlem–Uitgeest railway. The station has 2 platforms. The station was situated at the junction with the railway to IJmuiden, which closed on 25 September 1983. That line re-opened between 1996 and 1999, when Lovers Rail operated a service between Amsterdam and IJmuiden.

Train services
As of 9 December 2018, the following services call at Santpoort Noord:

National Rail

Bus services

External links
NS website 
Dutch public transport travel planner 

Railway stations in North Holland
Railway stations opened in 1957
Velsen